Gitee is an online forge that allows software version control using Git and is intended primarily for the hosting of open source software. It was launched by Shenzhen-based OSChina in 2013. Gitee claims to have more than 10 million repositories and 5 million users.

Gitee was chosen by the Ministry of Industry and Information Technology of the Chinese government  to make an "independent, open-source code hosting platform for China."

In May 18, 2022, Gitee announced all code will be manually reviewed before public availability. Gitee did not specify a reason for the change, though there was widespread speculation it was ordered by the Chinese government amid increasing online censorship in China.

References 

2013 software
Git (software)
Version control
Bug and issue tracking software
Computing websites
Collaborative projects
Project hosting websites
Project management software
Free and open-source software